The Bartel BM 2, originally Bartel M.2 was a Polish biplane primary trainer aircraft prototype of 1926.

Design and development
The aircraft was designed by Ryszard Bartel, a chief designer of Samolot factory in Poznań. It was the first Polish design of a trainer plane. Initially it was known as Bartel M.2, then BM 2 (M was for designer's wife Maryla). The prototype was flown on 7 December 1926 in Poznań. In June 1927 it was shown at the first Aviation Exhibition in Warsaw.  It was tested in 1927 and evaluated as quite good, but it was not built in series, because Bartel decided to design an improved aircraft, which resulted in the Bartel BM 4 trainer, which was produced in quantity. After flight testing, the prototype was removed from service.

A distinguishing feature of the BM 2 and all Bartels was an upper wing of a shorter span, because the lower and upper wing halves were interchangeable (i.e. the lower wingspan included the width of the fuselage).  Also Bartel put a stress on standardizing the construction materials used: steel pipes, metal sheet etc., in order to make production and repairs easier. A distinguishing feature of the BM 2 was the upper wing directly over the lower wing - unstaggered wings, while in later Bartel designs, the wings incorporate forward stagger - where the upper wing is mounted ahead of the lower wing.

Description
Wooden construction biplane, conventional in layout.  Fuselage rectangular in cross-section, plywood-covered (engine section - metal covered). Rectangular two-spar wings, plywood- and canvas-covered. Crew of two, sitting in tandem in open cockpits, with individual windshields. Cockpits with twin controls, the instructor seated aft.  Fixed landing gear, with a rear skid (main gear with a common axle, sprung with a rubber rope). Radial engine in the fuselage nose, without a cowling.

Specifications

See also

References

Bibliography

External links

Photo and drawings
Ugolok Neba site (in Russian)

1920s Polish civil trainer aircraft
1920s Polish military trainer aircraft
BM-2
Biplanes
Single-engined tractor aircraft